Matthew Ebden was the defending champion but lost in the second round to Marco Trungelliti.

Jordan Thompson won the title after defeating Grega Žemlja 6–1, 6–2 in the final.

Seeds

Draw

Finals

Top half

Bottom half

References
 Main Draw
 Qualifying Draw

2016 ATP Challenger Tour
2016 Singles
2016 in Australian tennis